The 2007-08 Carleton University Ravens men's basketball season began on August 31, 2007 with exhibition games against NCAA Division I teams, and with regular season games beginning on November 9. The season ended when the Ravens hosted the national championships at Scotiabank Place for the first time. Despite a stellar 22-0 regular season and 31-0 record against Canadian competition, the Ravens lost in the CIS semi-final to the Acadia Axemen, ending their 5 straight championships.

Roster

Coach: Dave Smart

Pre-season

Exhibition games against NCAA Division I Teams

Carleton performed well against some top teams from the NCAA at home in late August and early September. They lost to an Illinois team featuring Michael Jordan's son, Jeffrey Jordan in overtime. After going down to defeat against Villanova, the Ravens rebounded with a victory over the University of Alabama. They went to 3 U.S. Universities in late October and early November and were soundly defeated in all three.  

House-Laughton Tournament

Exhibition games on the road

Regular season

* Game was played at Scotiabank Place and not at the University of Ottawa.  (Capital Hoops Classic)

OUA Playoffs

CIS Final 8

Carleton Ravens men's basketball seasons
2007–08 in Canadian basketball by team